Nanhaia is a genus of flowering plants belonging to the family Fabaceae. Its native range is Southern China to Northern Vietnam.

Description
Nanhaia species are twining vines, sprawling or scrambling among rocks and scrub. Their stems are green or brown. Their leaves are evergreen and generally have 4–16 paired leaflets plus a terminal leaflet. Nine of the stamens are fused together, the other is free; all curve upwards at the apex.

Taxonomy

The genus Nanhaia was established in 2019 following a molecular phylogenetic study which showed that two species that Anne M. Schot had placed in Callerya in 1994 did not belong with the type species of that genus. The genus name is based on the Chinese name for the South China Sea between China and Vietnam, .

Nanhaia is placed in the tribe Wisterieae, where it forms a clade with the genus Wisteriopsis.

Species
, Plants of the World Online accepted two species:
Nanhaia fordii 
Nanhaia speciosa

Distribution
Nanhaia species are native to south-central and southeast mainland China, Hainan and Vietnam.

References

Wisterieae
Fabaceae genera